Bouncy house may refer to:

 Bouncy house (music), a subgenre of UK hard house
 an Inflatable castle